was a Japanese football player and manager. He played for Japan national team. He also managed Japan national team.

Club career
Kawamoto was born in Seto on January 17, 1914. He played for Waseda WMW, which consisted of players and graduates of his alma mater. The club won second place at the 1940 Emperor's Cup.

In 1941, Kawamoto served in the military during World War II and was detained in the Soviet Union following the war for four years (see Japanese prisoners of war in the Soviet Union). In December 1949, he returned to Japan when he was 35 years old, and became a player at Osaka SC. Osaka SC won second place at the Emperor's Cup three times, in 1951, 1952, and 1953.

National team career

In May 1934, when Kawamoto was a Waseda University student, he was selected Japan national team for 1934 Far Eastern Championship Games in Manila. At this competition, on May 13, he debuted and scored a goal against Dutch East Indies. In 1936, he was selected Japan for 1936 Summer Olympics in Berlin and scored a goal against Sweden. Japan completed a come-from-behind victory against Sweden. The first victory in Olympics for the Japan and the historic victory over one of the powerhouses became later known as "Miracle of Berlin" (ベルリンの奇跡) in Japan. In 2016, this team was selected Japan Football Hall of Fame.

After World War II, Kawamoto played at 1954 FIFA World Cup qualification and 1954 Asian Games. He was also a member of Japan as player and assistant coach for 1956 Summer Olympics, but he did not compete. He played 9 games and scored 4 goals for Japan until 1954. On May 3, 1954, he made history by becoming the oldest player to play for Japan national team at the age of 40 years and 106 days.

Coaching career
In 1956, Kawamoto served as assistant coach under manager Shigemaru Takenokoshi for 1956 Summer Olympics. In 1958, Kawamoto named a manager for Japan national team as Hidetoki Takahashi successor for 1958 Asian Games in Tokyo. At the 1958 Asian Games, Japan competed against the Philippines and Hong Kong. However, Japan lost both games and he resigned after the competition.

On September 20, 1985, Kawamoto died of stomach cancer in Osaka at the age of 71. In 2005, he was posthumously selected for the Japan Football Hall of Fame.

National team statistics

National team goals

References

External links

Japan National Football Team Database
Japan Football Hall of Fame at Japan Football Association
Japan Football Hall of Fame (Japan team at 1936 Olympics) at Japan Football Association
Profile at Archive.footballjapan.jp

1914 births
1985 deaths
Waseda University alumni
People from Seto, Aichi
Association football people from Aichi Prefecture
Japanese footballers
Japan international footballers
Japanese football managers
Japan national football team managers
Olympic footballers of Japan
Footballers at the 1936 Summer Olympics
Footballers at the 1956 Summer Olympics
Footballers at the 1954 Asian Games
Association football forwards
Asian Games competitors for Japan
Deaths from stomach cancer
Deaths from cancer in Japan
Japanese military personnel of World War II
Siberian internees